Dera Ismail Khan is a city in Khyber Pakhtunkhwa, Pakistan

Dera Ismail Khan may also refer to:

Dera Ismail Khan District, a district of Khyber Pakhtunkhwa, Pakistan
Dera Ismail Khan Tehsil, a tehsil of Dera Ismail Khan District
Dera Ismail Khan Division, an administrative unit of Khyber Pakhtunkhwa, Pakistan
Dera Ismail Khan Cantonment, a cantonment in Pakistan
Dera Ismail Khan Airport
Dera Ismail Khan cricket team, a local and domestic cricket team

See also
Dera Ismail Khan mine, a large gypsum mine
 
 
 Dera Ghazi Khan